Bomp! Records is a Los Angeles-based record label formed in 1974 by fanzine publisher and music historian Greg Shaw, and Suzy Shaw.

Magazine

Who Put the Bomp was a rock music fanzine edited and published by Greg Shaw from 1970 to 1979.<ref>Billboard Magazine, October 30, 1999 - Page 49 Koch Sees Personnel Shuffle; Bomp Records Turns 25 by Chris Morris</ref> Its name came from the 1961 hit doo-wop song by Barry Mann, "Who Put the Bomp". Later, the name was shortened to Bomp! Bomp!, and extended by Shaw to the  record label Bomp! Records, which he headed until his death in 2004.The New York Times, OCT. 27, 2004 - Greg Shaw, 55, Rock Enthusiast Who Loved Underground Music, Dies By BEN SISARIO

Background
The magazine was a departure from the mainstream and its writing style unique with its own opinion described as almost partisan. The magazine was first published in 1970. It was created by Greg Shaw and his wife. The magazine chronicled bands that Shaw deemed worthy of covering. And he did it passionately. Shaw made it known too that the magazine was not going to cater to nostalgia or be an info receptacle for fanatical collectors of obscure out of print records.

A significant number of writers who wrote for the magazine went on to greater things. Two journalists who had their careers launched via the magazine were Lester Bangs and Greil Marcus.

Staff
Ken Barnes who wrote articles like "10 Greatest Power Pop Songs" for Best Classic Bands, and other publications such as Fusion and Phonograph Record was once co-editor for the magazine. Jay Kinney who was a key man in the underground comics movement in the late 1960s, served as art director for the magazine.

Greg Shaw
Shaw was one of the first and best-known rock fanzine editors. Active in science fiction fandom as a young man, he became familiar with fanzines. Shaw founded one of the earliest rock fanzines, the mimeographed Mojo Navigator and Rock 'n Roll News in 1966.

Record label history

The label has featured punk, pop, power pop, garage rock, new wave, old school rock, neo-psychedelia among other genres. Its roster has included The Modern Lovers, Iggy & The Stooges, Stiv Bators & The Dead Boys, 20/20, Shoes, Devo, The Weirdos, The Romantics, Spacemen 3, the Germs, SIN 34, Jeff Dahl, The Brian Jonestown Massacre, and Black Lips.

Greg Shaw died from heart failure at the age of 55 on October 19, 2004. Bomp! Records is headed by his ex-wife, Suzy Shaw.

Suzy Shaw and Mick Farren co-authored Bomp: Saving the World One Record at a Time, published by Ammo Books in 2007. In 2009, Bomp! and Ugly Things published Bomp 2 – Born in the Garage'', edited by Suzy Shaw and Mike Stax.

Roster

 20/20
 Stiv Bators
 The Barracudas
 Beachwood Sparks
 The Beat
 Black Lips
 Blow-Up
 The Brian Jonestown Massacre
 Paul Collins
 Jeff Dahl
 Dead Boys
 Dead Meadow
 Devo
 DMZ
 Eyes of Mind
 Gravedigger Five
 Germs
 Hollowbody
 The Hangman's Beautiful Daughters
 The Haunted
 The Hollywood Squares
 Jon and the Nightriders (Voxx)
 The Konks
 The Last
 The Miracle Workers
 Modern Lovers
 The Morlocks
 The Nerves
 The Pandoras
 The Romantics
 Shoes
 SIN 34
 The Sonics
 Spacemen 3
 The Stooges
 Mark Sultan
 The Telescopes
 The Things
 The Warlocks
 The Weirdos
 The Unknowns
 Venus and the Razorblades
 The Zeros

See also
 List of record labels

References

External links
 Official site
 Bomp: Saving The World One Record At A Time (by Suzy Shaw and Mick Farren) (Defunct prior to 8/11)
 The Bomp! History lesson (Defunct before 8/11)
 (Who Put The) Bomp! Magazines #2-#21 - Cover pics
 A history of Bomp! magazine by Greg Shaw

American independent record labels
Record labels established in 1974
Vanity record labels
Garage punk
Garage rock record labels
Pop record labels
Punk record labels